Achmed Akkabi (born 3 October 1983, in The Hague) is a Moroccan-Dutch actor. 
Akkabi was born and raised in The Hague into a family of six. His parents are both immigrants from Morocco. Akkabi became a national celebrity as 'Rachid the merchandiser' in Albert Heijn commercials and for his roles as 'Appie' in Het Huis Anubis, 'Youssef' in the cinema movie Alibi and for presenting AVRO Kunstquest.

Selected filmography
 Brothers (2017)
 Soof 2 (2016)
 Rabat (2011)

References

External links

1983 births
Living people
Dutch television presenters
Dutch people of Moroccan descent
Male actors from The Hague